Jim McLeod's Jazz Tracks is a compilation album of jazz music recorded for Jim McLeod's long running ABC-FM radio show Jazztrack. The lead track "Windows of Arquez" by Bryce Rohde And Bruce Cale was at the time the shows theme song.

Reception
The album was nominated as the Best Jazz Album at the 1990 ARIA Awards but lost out to Browne, Costello & Grabowsky with their album Six By Three.

Adrian Jackson, writing in BRW, praised the album and signed off "hoping it turns out to be the first of a series."

Track listing

"Windows of Arquez" - Bryce Rohde and Bruce Cale
"Grandpa Spells" - Bob Barnard's Jazz Quartet 
"Moonglow" - Andrew Firth's Quartet
"When Lights Are Low" - The Swing Street Orchestra
"Tangerine" - Keith Hounslow's Quartet
"All Of Me" - Errol Buddle's Quartet
"Firm Roots" - The Dale Barlow Quartet
"Intersection" - Roger Frampton's Intersection
"Sergery" - The Bob Bertles Quartet
"Plain Talk" - Ten Part Invention
"Blue Mountains" - Bryce Rohde and Bruce Cale
"At play" - Ten Part Invention

The last two tracks only appear on the cd version of the album.

References

Compilation albums by Australian artists
Jazz albums by Australian artists